State Route 299 (SR 299) is a short north–south state highway located in the northwestern part of the U.S. state of Georgia. Its route is entirely within Dade County.

Route description
SR 299 begins at an intersection with US 11/SR 58 northeast of Wildwood. The highway heads west for one mile toward an interchange with I-24/SR 409 (Exit 169) before traveling through the unincorporated community of Hooker. The highway continues west toward the Tennessee state line where the road continues as Tennessee State Route 134. Unlike most west-to-east routes in the United States, SR 299's mile markers increase while traveling westbound rather than eastbound.

While the route sees an Annual Average Daily Traffic (AADT) of between 2,000 and 5,000 vehicles, the route's use as a through route has largely been supplanted by I-24, which passes through the same corridor as SR 299, and its continuation into Tennessee, Tennessee State Route 134.

Major intersections

See also

References

External links

299
Transportation in Dade County, Georgia